Gotthard or Saint Gotthard (Italian: San Gottardo) may refer to:

People 

 Gotthard of Hildesheim (960–1038), Roman Catholic saint
 Gotthard Heinrici (1886-1971), German General
 Uziel Gal, who grew up as Gotthard Glas

Places
 Saint-Gotthard Massif, a mountain range in Switzerland
 Gotthard nappe, the geological structure underneath the Saint-Gotthard Massif
 Gotthard Pass, a mountain pass between Airolo (Ticino) and Andermatt (Uri) in Switzerland
 Tunnels underneath Gotthard Pass:
 Gotthard Rail Tunnel (1882)
 Gotthard Road Tunnel (1980)
 Gotthard Base Tunnel (2016, part of the Swiss Alps Initiative)
 Gotthard railway line, a trans-alpine railway line in Switzerland
 Sankt Gotthard im Mühlviertel, a village in Upper Austria
 Szentgotthárd, a town in Western Hungary

Other uses
 Gotthard (band), a Swiss hard rock band
 Battle of Saint Gotthard (1664), a battle in the Austro-Turkish War fought near Szentgotthárd
 Battle of Saint Gotthard (1705), a battle in Rákóczi's War for Independence fought near Szentgotthárd
 Gotthard (album)

See also 

 Gottardo (disambiguation)
 San Gottardo (disambiguation)